The 2016 Collegiate Rugby Championship is a college rugby sevens tournament played June 4–5 at Talen Energy Stadium in Chester, Pennsylvania, a suburb of Philadelphia. It is the seventh annual Collegiate Rugby Championship, and the sixth consecutive year that the tournament will be at Talen Energy Stadium (formerly known as PPL Park). The event was broadcast on NBC and NBCSN.
Commentators were Todd Harris and Brian Hightower. California won the championship, defeating UCLA 31–7 in an all-Pac-12 final.  Attendance for the two-day event was 27,224.

Pool stage

Pool A

Pool B

Pool C

Pool D

Pool E

Pool F

Knockout stage

Bowl

Plate

Cup

Players

Source:

Dream Team
 Jesse Milne (California) — Tournament MVP
 Russell Webb (California)
 Niall Barry (UCLA)
 Seb Sharpe (UCLA)
 Tyler Sousley (Arizona)
 Wes Hartmann (Kutztown)
 Zinzan Elan-Puttick (Arkansas State)
 Cody Melphy (Life)
 Jack Braun (Dartmouth)
 Jake Syndergaard (Wisconsin)
 Chad Gough (Utah)
 Evan Towle (Virginia Tech)

Source:

References 

2016
2016 rugby union tournaments for clubs
2016 in American rugby union
2016 rugby sevens competitions
2016 in sports in Pennsylvania
Collegiate Rugby